Filodes decoloralis is a moth in the family Crambidae. It was described by Snellen in 1899. It is found on Sumatra.

References

Moths described in 1899
Spilomelinae
Moths of Indonesia